P S Manisundaram (December 9, 1927 – October 26, 2013) was an Indian educationist and pioneer of computer science education. He was born in Mandalay, Myanmar (Burma). He graduated from Loyola College, Chennai (Madras), Tamil Nadu, India. After completing master's degree studies in civil engineering at Nova Scotia University, Canada, in 1958, he returned to Tamil Nadu and started his career as a lecturer at Alagappa Chettiar College of Engineering and Technology, Karaikudi, Tamil Nadu. He was the first principal of the Regional Engineering College (currently the National Institute of Technology), Tiruchirappalli, Tamil Nadu. He became the first vice chancellor of the Bharathidasan University, Tiruchirappalli, Tamil Nadu, when the university was created in 1982. Manisundaram was associated with many universities and educational institutions in India and around the world. He was conferred Doctor of Engineering (Honoris Causa) by Dalhousie University (Formerly Technical University of Nova Scotia), Halifax, Canada in 1984.  He died in Chennai (Madras), India, on October 26, 2013.

References

External links
National Institute of Technology, Tiruchirappalli Retrieved 3 November 2013.
Bharathidasan University, Tiruchirappalli Retrieved 3 November 2013.

1927 births
2013 deaths
Indian expatriates in Myanmar
Indian educators